Sir Colin Terence Dollery (14 March 1931 – 12 December 2020) was a clinical pharmacologist who spent much of his life working for SmithKline Beecham and its successor, Glaxo Smith Kline. He was knighted in the Queen's 1987 birthday honours. He was an honorary fellow of the British Pharmacological Society and a fellow of the Academy of Medical Sciences.

After graduating in medicine from the University of Birmingham in 1956, Dollery specialized in clinical pharmacology. He was appointed as a lecturer in therapeutics at the Royal Postgraduate Medical School, London, in 1963, being promoted to Professor of Clinical Pharmacology in 1968. During his career he was:
Founding Chairman of the Clinical Pharmacology Section of the British Pharmacological Society (1975–1975)
Chair of the Clinical Section of the International Union of Pharmacology (IUPHAR; 1975–1978)
President of the IUPHAR (1987–1990). 

He received many awards including the Wellcome Gold Medal awarded by the British Pharmacological Society. His work led to major advances in cardiovascular pharmacology including work with the Nobel Laureate, Sir James Black concerning beta blockers. Dollery spent time in both academia and industry (SmithKline Beecham and then GSK post the merger). He was also active within IUPHAR, where he was part of the clinical translational pharmacology group of the Nomenclature Committee.

His fields of interest included hypertension and drug safety.

In 1993 he gave the Harveian Oration.

Books
Books authored or edited include:

References

Further reading
, a video biography compiled by the British Pharmacological Society

External links
Linkedin profile

Alumni of the University of Birmingham
Academics of Imperial College London
Clinical pharmacologists
Fellows of the Academy of Medical Sciences (United Kingdom)
Fellows of the British Pharmacological Society
People educated at Lincoln Grammar School